In enzymology, a selenide, water dikinase is an enzyme that catalyzes the chemical reaction

ATP + selenide + H2O  AMP + selenophosphate + phosphate

The 3 substrates of this enzyme are ATP, selenide, and H2O, whereas its 3 products are AMP, selenophosphate, and phosphate.

This enzyme belongs to the family of transferases, to be specific, those transferring phosphorus-containing groups (phosphotransferases) with paired acceptors (dikinases). The systematic name of this enzyme class is ATP:selenide, water phosphotransferase. This enzyme is also called selenophosphate synthetase. This enzyme participates in selenoamino acid metabolism.

References

 

EC 2.7.9
Enzymes of unknown structure